The Daniel and Florence Guggenheim Foundation is located at 950 Third Avenue in Manhattan.
New York, NY 10022.

History
The Daniel and Florence Guggenheim Foundation was founded in 1924 by Florence (née Shloss) and Daniel Guggenheim.

Between 1930 and 1941 the foundation financed Robert H. Goddard. When the United States government settled a patent lawsuit for infringing the Goddard patent for liquid fuel rockets, that money was awarded to the foundation.

The foundation was terminated on June 30, 2011. The Daniel and Florence Guggenheim Foundation Program on Demography, Technology and Criminal Justice has taken over some of the functions.

References

External links
The Daniel and Florence Guggenheim Foundation Program on Demography, Technology and Criminal Justice at the Library of Congress

Scientific research foundations in the United States
1924 establishments in New York (state)
2011 disestablishments in New York (state)
Organizations established in 1924
Organizations disestablished in 2011